A mesocyclone is a meso-gamma mesoscale (or storm scale) region of rotation (vortex), typically around  in diameter, most often noticed on radar within thunderstorms. In the northern hemisphere it is usually located in the right rear flank (back edge with respect to direction of movement) of a supercell, or often on the eastern, or leading, flank of a high-precipitation variety of supercell. The area overlaid by a mesocyclone’s circulation may be several miles (km) wide, but substantially larger than any tornado that may develop within it, and it is within mesocyclones that intense tornadoes form.

Description 
Mesocyclones are medium-scale vortices of rising and converging air that circulate around a vertical axis. They are most often associated with a local region of low-pressure. Their rotation is (usually) in the same direction as low pressure systems in a given hemisphere: counter-clockwise in the northern, and clockwise in the southern hemisphere, with the only occasional exceptions being the smallest-scale mesocyclones. Meso Anticyclones that rotate in an opposite direction may accompany mesocyclones within a supercell but these tend to be weaker and often more transient than mesocyclones, which can be sustained for tens of minutes or hours, and also cyclically form in succession within a supercell.

A mesocyclone is usually a phenomenon that is difficult to observe directly. Visual evidence of rotation – such as curved inflow bands – may suggest the presence of a mesocyclone, but the cylinder of circulating air is often too large to be recognized when viewed from the ground, or may not carry clouds distinct enough from the surrounding calmer air to make the circulating air flow obvious.
Mesocyclones are best detected on Doppler weather radar as a rotation signature which meets specific criteria for magnitude, vertical depth, and duration. On U.S. NEXRAD radar displays, they are typically highlighted by a yellow solid circle on the Doppler velocity display; other weather services may have other conventions.

Within thunderstorms 
They are of greatest concern when contained within severe thunderstorms, since mesocyclones often occur together with updrafts in supercells, within which tornadoes may form near the interchange with a downdraft.

Thunderstorms containing persistent mesocyclones are supercell thunderstorms (although some supercells and even tornadic storms do not produce lightning or thunder and thus are not technically thunderstorms). Doppler weather radar is used to identify mesocyclones. A mesovortex is a similar but typically smaller and weaker rotational feature associated with squall lines.

Formation 
Mesocyclones form when strong changes of wind speed and/or direction with height ("wind shear") sets parts of the lower part of the atmosphere spinning in invisible tube-like rolls. The convective updraft of a storm then draws up this spinning air, tilting the rolls' orientation upward (from parallel to the ground to perpendicular) and causing the entire updraft to rotate as a vertical column.

As the updraft rotates and ingests cooler, moister air from the forward flank downdraft (FFD), it may form a wall cloud, a spinning layer of clouds lowered from ambient storm cloud base under the mid-level mesocyclone. The wall cloud tends to form closer to the center of the mesocyclone. As it descends, a funnel cloud may form near its center. This is usually the first visible stage of development of a tornado.

The gallery below shows the 3 stages of development of a mesocyclone and a view of the storm relative motion on radar of a mesocyclone-producing tornado over Greensburg, Kansas on 4 May 2007. The storm was in the process of producing an EF5 tornado at the time of the image.

Identification 
The most reliable way to detect a mesocyclone is by Doppler weather radar. Nearby high values of opposite sign within velocity data are how they are detected. Mesocyclones are most often located in the right-rear flank of supercell thunderstorms and when embedded within squall lines (whereas mesovortices most often form in the front flank of squall lines), and may be distinguished by a hook echo rotation signature on a weather radar map. Visual cues such as a rotating wall cloud or tornado may also hint at the presence of a mesocyclone. This is why the term has entered into wider usage in connection with rotating features in severe storms.

Tornado formation 

Tornado formation is not completely understood, but often occurs in one of two ways.

In the first method, two conditions must be satisfied:
 First, a horizontal spinning effect must form on the Earth's surface. This usually originates in sudden changes in wind direction or speed, known as wind shear.
 Second, a thundercloud[colloquialism],or occasionally a cumulus cloud, must be present.
During a thunderstorm, updrafts are occasionally powerful enough to lift the horizontal spinning row of air upwards, turning it into a vertical air column. This vertical air column then becomes the basic structure for the tornado. Tornadoes that form in this way are often weak and generally last less than 10 minutes.

The second method occurs during a supercell thunderstorm, in updrafts within the storm. When winds intensify, the force released can cause the updrafts to rotate. This rotating updraft is known as a mesocyclone.

For a tornado to form in this manner, a rear-flank downdraft enters the center of the mesocyclone from the back. Cold air, being denser than warm air, is able to penetrate the updraft. The combination of the updraft and downdraft completes the development of a tornado. Tornadoes that form in this method are often violent and can last over an hour.

Mesoscale convective vortex

A mesoscale convective vortex (MCV), also known as a mesoscale vorticity center or Neddy eddy, is a mesocyclone within a mesoscale convective system (MCS) that pulls winds into a circling pattern, or vortex, at the mid levels of the troposphere and is normally associated with anticyclonic outflow aloft, with a region of aeronautically troublesome wind shear between the upper and lower air. MCVs can persist for up to two days after its parent mesoscale convective system has dissipated.

The orphaned MCV can become the seed of the next thunderstorm outbreak. An MCV that moves into tropical waters, such as the Gulf of Mexico, can serve as the nucleus for a tropical cyclone. The May 2009 Southern Midwest Derecho was an extreme progressive derecho and mesoscale convective vortex event that struck southeastern Kansas, southern Missouri, and southwestern Illinois on 8 May 2009.

References

External links

 

Severe weather and convection
Types of cyclone
Tornadogenesis